Charles Garabed Atamian (September 18, 1872 – July 30, 1947) was an Ottoman-born French painter of Armenian ethnicity.

Biography 
Garabed Atamian was the second of five children of Mıgırdiç Atamian, a goldsmith and musician, and Mary Afkerian. He completed his early education at the Mkhitaryan Armenian School in Pera, Istanbul. He then attended the local French school Lycée de Saint-Benoit. He continued his education at the Murad Rafaelian Armenian School in the San Lazzaro Island at Venice, Italy, where between 1887 and 1893 he took lessons from professors Antonio Ermolao Paoletti and Pietra. For a time he studied at the Academy of Fine Arts, but returned to Istanbul without graduating and worked at the Yildiz Porcelain Factory from 1894 to 1896. He was appointed as the factory's chief designer. A number of his porcelain plates bearing his signature "Atam" are now exhibited at the Topkapi Palace. Plates which he created include portraits of Mahmud II, Selim and Abdul Mejid.

He opened his first exhibition prior to the Hamidian massacres where Armenians in Istanbul were massacred en masse. As a result of the unfavorable political conditions of the period, his work failed to arouse interest and support. Due to the massacres against Armenians, Atamian sought refuge in Paris in 1897. In Paris he illustrated nearly 150 books, including novels by such famous writers as Anatole France, Guy de Maupassant, Henri Bordeaux, and René Bazin and the French translation of B. Litton's The Last Days of Pompei until World War I.

Atamian found success creating artwork for commercial purposes including books and magazines. He worked for leading French newspapers and magazines such as L'Illustration and Le Monde Illustre. He also created artwork for theatrical stage productions. His first oil painting was exhibited at Salon d'Automne in 1903.

From 1903 and onwards, he participated in various exhibitions with overwhelming success. Of particular note are his landscapes and portraits shown at the annual exhibitions of the National Society of Artists in Paris. In 1923, he went for the summer to Saint-Gilles-sur-Vie in Vendée. He returned regularly until 1939. Much of his work were developed at this summer residence and it is his paintings of its beach that are his works that consolidated his reputation as an artist. He became a permanent member of the society in 1927.

One-person exhibitions of his work were held in Paris at the Allard Gallery in 1921 and in the Georges Petit Gallery in 1923 and 1935, in Brussels in 1925, in Strasbourg in 1926, at the Simonson Gallery in 1928 and 1930, and at the Rosenthal Gallery in 1936. His wife died in 1941. That year, feeling the first symptoms of a contracted disease, he stopped painting while continuing to exhibit. His last known work is a self-portrait dated 1941. He died in his workshop July 30, 1947. Many of his paintings exhibited in various cities of Europe, the United States, and Japan were reproduced as postcards. His granddaughter bequeathed 42 paintings of the artist to the municipality of Saint-Gilles-Croix-de-Vie in 1995.

Exhibitions

During his lifetime 
Note that he exhibited regularly at the Salon of the Société Nationale des Beaux-Arts from 1913 to 1945 and at the Salon des Independants from 1938 to 1945.
 1903 Salon d'Automne (Batz paintings), the Salon d'Automne was created and organized for the first time On October 31, 1903 at the Petit Palais
 1918: Marseille, Mouillot Gallery (My mother)
 1919: The National (paintings Agay)
 1920: The National (Rhododendrons). There will exhibit until 1945
 March 1921: Allard Gallery (paintings of Saint-Jean-de-Luz, Villennes-sur-Seine)
 1923: Galerie Georges Petit
 July 1923: Strasbourg
 1924: Gallery Pouillé-Lepoutre, Lyon
 1925: French Artists in Brussels (60 paintings)
 1925: Devambez Gallery, Paris
 May 1927 and October 1927 Galerie Georges Petit
 August 1927: Beaux-Arts de Calais
 November 1928: Simonson Gallery, 19 rue Caumartin, Paris (paintings of Nice and Saint-Gilles)
 1929: Exhibition of Contemporary French Art, Tokyo, Osaka continued in 1930

Posthumous 
 July–August 2006: Saint-Hilaire-de-Monts, 24 works
 December 2007 - March 2007: Cagnes-sur-Mer, The Armenian painting in the nineteenth and twentieth century works on loan from the Musée d'Orsay
 February–June 2007: Paris, Musée National de la Marine Exhibition Aivazovsky
 September–October 2009: Saint-Gilles-Croix-de-Vie, Marcel Baudouin room
 June 2010:-Lucs-sur-Boulogne, Sénéchal Gallery

References

External links 
 

19th-century painters from the Ottoman Empire
Ethnic Armenian painters
Armenians from the Ottoman Empire
Artists from Istanbul
1872 births
1947 deaths
Emigrants from the Ottoman Empire to France
19th-century French painters
19th-century French male artists
French male painters
20th-century French painters
20th-century French male artists
San Lazzaro degli Armeni alumni
Survivors of the Hamidian massacres